Clepsis gelophodes is a species of moth of the family Tortricidae. It is found in Venezuela and Colombia.

References

Moths described in 1936
Clepsis